Yvonne Doyle (born 7 December 1974) is an Irish former professional tennis player.

Playing for Ireland at the Fed Cup, Doyle has a win–loss record of 31–18.

ITF Circuit finals

Singles: 4 (2 titles, 2 runner-ups)

Doubles: 16 (8 titles, 8 runner-ups)

References

External links
 
 
 

1974 births
Living people
Irish female tennis players
Tennis players from Dublin (city)